Ian Hamilton McDonald (28 July 1923 – 5 February 2019) was an Australian cricketer. He played 40 first-class cricket matches for Victoria between 1948 and 1953 as a wicket keeper.

References

External links
 

1923 births
2019 deaths
Australian cricketers
Victoria cricketers
Cricketers from Melbourne
People from Windsor, Victoria